The Kia K8 is a full-size sedan manufactured by Kia. Replacing the K7/Cadenza, it was released in April 2021 in South Korea.

Overview 

The Kia K8 was first offered for sale on 8 April 2021 with an online launch.  Pictures of the K8 were released on 17 February 2021.  Features include a driver-center layout with a curved display and 12-inch head-up display, updated infotainment plus HVAC systems, lighting synced with the navigation system, driver's ergomotion seat, and multi-function center armrest and headrest.

It is similar to the mechanically identical sixth-generation Hyundai Grandeur/Azera twin, the vehicle would not become available to the North American market.

K8 Hybrid 
Kia K8 Hybrid was released on 4 May 2021, offering a 1.6-litre turbo hybrid engine in addition to the conventional engine, 17-inch machined-face wheels, an emblem that indicates the vehicle is electric, and a dedicated cluster graphic.

Powertrain 
The K8 will be offered with a 3.5-litre V6 engine producing , or the base 2.5-litre inline four making . An optional 3.5-litre LPI (Liquid Propane Injection) engine will be offered that makes . It is paired with an 8-speed automatic transmission, which is claimed to improve the V6 engines’ fuel economy by up to 6 percent.

References

External links 

 

K8
Cars introduced in 2021
Full-size vehicles
Sedans
Front-wheel-drive vehicles
All-wheel-drive vehicles
Hybrid electric cars
Partial zero-emissions vehicles